is a former Japanese football player and manager. He was appointed the Elite Development Coach of the Hong Kong Football Association in 2016. Since September 2020, he started working as Technical Director for Vietnam Football Federation.

Playing career
Adachi was born in Kanagawa Prefecture on December 5, 1961. He played for the Yomiuri reserve team from 1980 to 1984.

Coaching career
After retirement, in 1988, Adachi he started coaching career at Fujita Industries (later Bellmare Hiratsuka). He mainly managed youth team until 1998. In 1999, he moved to Cerezo Osaka and he managed youth team until 2001. In 2005, he signed with Yokohama FC. He managed until March 2006.

Managerial statistics

References

External links

1961 births
Living people
Tamagawa University alumni
Association football people from Kanagawa Prefecture
Japanese footballers
Japanese football managers
J2 League managers
Yokohama FC managers
Association footballers not categorized by position